The Scottish National Party depute leadership election ran from 18 May to 8 June 2018. The election was contested for the party's new depute leader following the resignation of Angus Robertson in February 2018, after he lost his Westminster seat in the 2017 snap election.

Keith Brown was announced as the winner of the election on 8 June 2018.

Procedure 
Ballots opened on 18 May. The winner was announced as Keith Brown at the SNP conference in Aberdeen on 8 June.

Candidates 
Nominations closed on 13 April 2018, there were three candidates:

 Keith Brown Member of the Scottish Parliament for Clackmannanshire and Dunblane and Cabinet Secretary for Economy, Jobs and Fair Work
 Julie Hepburn, the only candidate who is not an elected representative
 Chris McEleny, a councillor who ran in the last depute leadership election

Withdrew 
 James Dornan, Member of the Scottish Parliament for Glasgow Cathcart who withdrew his candidacy on 8 April. He threw his support behind candidate Julie Hepburn.

Declined 
 Pete Wishart 
 Joanna Cherry
 Tommy Sheppard
 Ian Blackford
 Philippa Whitford

Campaign 
The status of a second Scottish independence referendum was considered as a significant issue surrounding the depute leadership election, with Chris McEleny and Julie Hepburn seen as supporters of such a referendum occurring earlier rather than later.

Endorsements

Keith Brown 
 Clare Adamson
 Ash Denham
 Annabelle Ewing
 Margaret Ferrier
 Ben MacPherson
 Ivan McKee
 Gil Paterson
 Humza Yousaf

Chris McEleny 
 Angus McNeil

Julie Hepburn 
 Aileen Campbell
 James Dornan
 Bob Doris
 Fulton MacGregor
 Gillian Martin
 Alison Thewliss
 Kirsten Oswald
 Sandra White

Results 
The depute leadership election was conducted using the single transferable vote system, with the results being declared on 8 June. Keith Brown was elected as the new Depute Leader of the Scottish National Party with a majority of 55.2% of votes cast in the second round of voting, beating rival candidate Julie Hepburn who secured 44.8%. Candidate Chris McEleny finished third with 16.2%, having been eliminated in the first round of voting.

References

External links 
 Nominations close in SNP deputy leadership race. BBC NEWS. Published 13 April 2018.

2018
2018 in Scotland
2010s elections in Scotland
2018 elections in the United Kingdom
Scottish National Party depute leadership election